Qameshlu or Qomeshlu, also rendered as Qamishlu, may refer to:

Qamishlu, East Azerbaijan
Qomeshlu, East Azerbaijan
Qomishlu, Isfahan Province
Qameshlu, Kurdistan
Qameshlu, Markazi
Qameshlu, Qazvin
Qameshlu, Tehran
Qameshlu, West Azerbaijan
Qamishlu, West Azerbaijan
Qameshlu, Afshar, Zanjan Province
Qameshlu, Sojas Rud, Zanjan Province
Ghamishlu, Azerbaijan